Il marito in collegio is a 1977 Italian comedy film directed by Maurizio Lucidi. It is based on the novel with the same name by Giovanni Guareschi.

Plot 
A gas station attendant (Enrico Montesano) falls in love with a Lombard noblewoman (Silvia Dionisio), who agrees to marry him just to get his uncle's inheritance.

Cast 
Enrico Montesano as Camillo Proietti
Silvia Dionisio as Carlotta
Anna Proclemer as  Donna Leo Madellis
Mario Carotenuto as  Casimiro Zanin
Stefania Careddu as  Robinia
Pino Caruso as  Baron Filippo Pancaldi d'Entreves
Gastone Pescucci as Giusmaria 
Liana Trouché as  Carlotta's mother 
Bombolo as  Baron's driver

References

External links

1977 films
Italian comedy films
1977 comedy films
Films based on works by Giovannino Guareschi
Films directed by Maurizio Lucidi
Films scored by Armando Trovajoli
1970s Italian films